Taurian World School also known as TWS, is an International school nestled in Ranchi City in Jharkhand, India. The school was founded on 30 June 2008 by Mr. Amith Bajla, a social entrepreneur at an age of 35. He hails from Deogarh, Jharkhand and is an alumnus of the London School of Economics.

References



International schools in India
Primary schools in India
High schools and secondary schools in Jharkhand
Schools in Ranchi
Co-educational schools in India
Co-educational boarding schools